Muhamed Pašalić (born August 27, 1987) is a Bosnian professional basketball player who currently plays for Belfius Mons-Hainaut of the BNXT League. He also represents the Bosnia and Herzegovina national basketball team internationally.

Professional career
Pašalić made his professional debut with Bosna in the 2006–07 season. In August 2011, Pašalić moved to Kavala in Greece, where he would spend just one season. In August 2012, Pašalić signed with Aris for the 2012–13 season.

After playing for Reims Champagne Basket in the 2013–14 season, he returned to Aris for the 2014–15 season. In June 2015, he signed with the Romanian League club U BT Cluj-Napoca.

On July 14, 2016, Pašalić signed with Romanian team CSM Oradea.

On September 1, 2019, Pašalić returned to Greece and signed with Panionios. He was released from his contract on December 22 of the same year, in order to attend to his newborn second child.

On August 3, 2021, he sigendwith Belfius Mons-Hainaut in Belgium.

Bosnian national team
Pašalić first played for Bosnia and Herzegovina at the EuroBasket 2013. He was also on the roster for the EuroBasket 2015 qualification.

References

External links
 Muhamed Pašalić at eurobasket.com
 Muhamed Pašalić at draftexpress.com
 Muhamed Pašalić at fiba.com

1987 births
Living people
ABA League players
Aris B.C. players
Basketball players from Sarajevo
Bosnia and Herzegovina men's basketball players
CS Universitatea Cluj-Napoca (men's basketball) players
CSM Oradea (basketball) players
Greek Basket League players
Kavala B.C. players
KK Bosna Royal players
Point guards
Reims Champagne Basket players